Cyclotrypema is a genus of leaf beetles in the family Chrysomelidae. There is one described species in Cyclotrypema, Cyclotrypema furcata. They are found in Texas and Mexico.

References

Further reading

 
 

Galerucinae
Articles created by Qbugbot
Monotypic Chrysomelidae genera
Taxa named by Doris Holmes Blake